Ghetto Hymns is the solo debut studio album by American contemporary R&B singer Dave Hollister. His first effort (after his success with Blackstreet), the album was co-produced by Hollister and Erick Sermon. It peaked at number 34 on the US Billboard 200.

Three singles were released from the album: "My Favorite Girl", "Can't Stay" and "Baby Mama Drama". "My Favorite Girl" is Hollister's only hit to date on the US Billboard Hot 100, peaking at number 39 in 1999. In addition to original songs, the album contains covers of the Michael McDonald song "I Keep Forgettin' (Every Time You're Near)" and the Twinkie Clark-Terrell song "In Him There is No Sorrow"  (listed on the album as "Keep Forgettin'" and "Respect 2 Him", respectively).

Track listing
Credits adapted from the album's liner notes.

Notes
  denotes co-producer

Sample credits
 "Came in the Door Pimpin'" contains a sample of "Tom's Diner" by Suzanne Vega.
 "Call on Me" contains a sample of "Soul Shadows" by The Crusaders featuring Bill Withers.

Charts

Weekly charts

Year-end charts

Certifications

References

External links
 
 

1999 debut albums
Albums produced by Dave Hollister
Albums produced by Erick Sermon
Dave Hollister albums
DreamWorks Records albums